Kotar may refer to:

 Kotar (musical instrument), a stringed instrument that is a cross between a guitar and a koto
 Kothar-wa-Khasis, a Canaanite deity
 Kotar (subdivision), a long-abolished subdivision of former Yugoslavia
 Kotar, Satna, a town in Madhya Pradesh, India
 Kotar, Iran, a village in Kermanshah Province, Iran
 Doug Kotar, an American football running back
 Kotar (orca), a deceased male orca